Best of James Ray's Performance & Gangwar is a compilation album by James Ray and The Performance and James Rays Gangwar, released on March 5, 1996 by Fifth Colvmn Records.

Reception

AllMusic awarded Best of James Ray's Performance & Gangwar four out of five stars. Aiding & Abetting recommended the anthology to listeners of The Sisters of Mercy and said "Ray avoids some of the dreary excesses that later Sisters stuff got bogged down in, and simply cranks out quite a few moody yet catchy tunes." A critic at  commended the album and said "sounds nice, and is a bit poppier than you might think."

Track listing

Personnel 
Adapted from the ''Best of James Ray's Performance & Gangwar' liner notes.

James Ray's Performance & Gangwar
 Travis Earl – guitar
 James Ray – vocals, mixing (6-13)
 John Ridge – guitar
 Damon Vingoe – bass guitar

Production and design
 Andrew Eldritch – producer (1-5)
 Zalman Fishman – executive-production
 Hugh Jones – producer (1-5)
 Roy Neave – producer and mixing (6-13)

Release history

References

External links 
 Best of James Ray's Performance & Gangwar at Discogs (list of releases)

1996 compilation albums
James Ray (rock musician) albums
Fifth Colvmn Records compilation albums
Albums produced by Hugh Jones (producer)